The Montes de Toledo are one of the main systems of mountain ranges in the Iberian Peninsula. They divide the drainage basin of the Tagus from the basin of the Guadiana.

Description
The Montes de Toledo are located in the central regions of the Iberian Peninsula, cutting transversally from east to west across the lower portion of the Meseta Central.

The eastern Montes de Toledo ranges form one of the natural limits of the historical La Mancha region in Castile-La Mancha and the western end, including the ranges forming the broader Montes de Toledo, reaches into Portalegre District, Portugal.

Geology
Geologically the series of ranges making up the system were formed by Alpine orogeny, but unlike the Central System further north the Montes de Toledo comprise an older terrain of elongated belts of folded and thrust faulted sedimentary rocks that is quite heavily eroded.

The geological structure of the Montes de Toledo is similar to the geology of the Appalachians and akin as well to the geology of the Sierra Morena range further south.

Ranges
The Montes de Toledo are divided in the following physiographic longitudinal sectors or zones:
The Montes de Toledo in a strict sense are located in the eastern section of the system, in northwestern Ciudad Real Province and southwestern Toledo Province, giving its name to the Montes de Toledo Comarca. Despite its name this comarca only includes a small part of the range. The main summits of this region are Rocigalgo, Corral de Cantos, Peñafiel and Amor (1379).
Other ranges of this zone are Sierra de los Yébenes, Sierra de San Pablo, Macizos de Montalbán and Macizos de Rocilargo.  
The broader Montes de Toledo system includes the following ranges stretching towards the west:
Sierra de Altamira, highest point Riscos Altos. Other noteworthy peaks are Risco de las Moras and Risco de los Gavilanes. It is located in La Jara Comarca at the border area between Extremadura and Castilla-La Mancha. Nearby are minor ranges such as the Sierra de Sevilleja, Sierra de la Hiruela and Sierra del Horno, also known collectively as "Sierras de la Jara".
Sierra del Hospital del Obispo, parallel to the Sierra de Altamira further east. Cervales, is the highest point of the range. The Guadarranque River runs by Navatrasierra in the valley between the two ranges. 
Sierra de Villuercas, also known as Sierra de Guadalupe, it rises within Extremadura in Las Villuercas comarca, province of Cáceres. This range is where the highest altitudes of the whole system are found.
Sierra de Montánchez, located in the central/southern region of Cáceres Province. Other notable summits are Cancho Blanco and Alijares.
Sierra de San Pedro, between Cáceres and Badajoz provinces. Its highest peaks are Torrico de San Pedro, Atalaya, Chorlo, Morrón del Cotarro and Manzano. The Sierra de Carbajo, also known as Sierra de Santiago is a small range located north of the western end of Sierra de San Pedro, above Carbajo and Santiago de Alcántara.
Serra de São Mamede, located in the Alto Alentejo Province, Portugal, bordering Extremadura. Higher than the preceding two ranges, this range forms the western end of the greater Montes de Toledo. Other important peaks are Fria, Pico de Marvão and Castelo de Vide. The town of Marvão is located on top of a ridge of the range.

Main ranges and features

Protected areas
Cabañeros National Park
Serra de São Mamede Natural Park

See also
Montes de Toledo Comarca
La Jara
Dehesa del Carrizal
Geology of the Iberian Peninsula

References

External links

Parque Nacional de Cabañeros La belleza de los Montes de Toledo 
Ordovician -Dobrotivian (Llandeillian Stage) to Ashgill- Crinoids from the Montes de Toledo and Sierra Morena

 
Mountain ranges of Portugal
Toledo
Toledo